The Circle of Heroes is an underwater military veterans memorial 10 miles off the coast of Honeymoon Island State Park in the Gulf of Mexico. It is the first underwater veterans memorial.

The memorial
The statues were placed during the week of July 22, 2019 after 2-1/2 years of planning and creating. It was dedicated on August 5, 2019 and currently has thirteen 6-foot tall statues at a depth of 40 feet underwater with plans to add an additional twelve statues. At the center, there is a 4 foot high, 3-ton pentagon shaped monument with the emblems from five military branches, Air Force, Army, Coast Guard, Marine Corps and Navy. The statues form a 100 foot circle around the center monument. The memorial is considered a recreational dive site.

Each statue weighs 1,200 pounds.

Statues
The statues depict:

Navy Sailor
Southeast Asia War Soldier
Korean War Soldier
Marine in Dress Blues
Vietnam Soldier
Air Force Pilot
No Man Left Behind
Gulf War Soldier
Iraq War Soldier
Iraq Freedom Fighter
Army Nurse
Soldier Kneeling & Battle Cross
Coast Guard Sailor

References

 

2019 establishments in Florida
Buildings and structures completed in 2019
Dunedin, Florida
Gulf of Mexico
Military monuments and memorials in the United States
Statues in Florida
Underwater diving sites in the United States
Underwater monuments and memorials